Girolamo Corio or Girolamo Coiro (died 1651) was a Roman Catholic prelate who served as Bishop of Parma (1650–1651).

Biography
Girolamo Corio was born in Milan, Italy.
On 2 May 1650, he was appointed during the papacy of Pope Innocent X as Bishop of Parma.
On 6 Jun 1650, he was consecrated bishop by Giovanni Giacomo Panciroli, Cardinal-Priest of Santo Stefano al Monte Celio, with Giovanni Battista Rinuccini, Archbishop of Fermo, and Luca Torreggiani, Archbishop of Ravenna, serving as co-consecrators. 
He served as Bishop of Parma until his death on 26 Jul 1651.

References

External links and additional sources
 (for Chronology of Bishops) 
 (for Chronology of Bishops) 

17th-century Italian Roman Catholic bishops
Bishops appointed by Pope Innocent X
1651 deaths